Plant System was a system of railways and boats in the American South.

Plant system may also refer to:
 Ground tissue, three simple plant tissues
 Vascular tissue, a complex tissue found in vascular plants
 Epidermis (botany), the outer single-layered group of cells covering a plant